Kepolydesmus is a genus of flat-backed millipedes in the family Nearctodesmidae. There are at least four described species in Kepolydesmus.

Species
These four species belong to the genus Kepolydesmus:
 Kepolydesmus anderisus (Chamberlin, 1910)
 Kepolydesmus hesperus Chamberlin, 1949
 Kepolydesmus mimus Chamberlin, 1947
 Kepolydesmus pungo Chamberlin, 1949

References

Further reading

 
 

Polydesmida
Articles created by Qbugbot